Kapsi is a large village and local marketplace in the Kanker district of Chhattisgarh state in India. The village holds significance as a model village under two distinct schemes of the Government of India, namely the Sansad Adarsh Gram Yojana and the National Rurban Mission. Owing to its sizeable tribal population, it is defined as a Scheduled Area under the Fifth Schedule of the Constitution of India.

Geography
Kapsi is situated in the western part of the Kanker district in the Paralkot region, bordering the state of Maharashtra. It is also called the gateway of Paralkot. Geographically, it lies in the northern lowlands of the Bastar plateau and is a part of historical Dandakaranya region. The elevation of the village ranges from 310 to 330 m above sea level.

A local water body known as the Devda ravine meanders through the village and serves as its lifeline. The region primarily features fertile lateritic soil, which is well-suited to agriculture due to its fine texture and darker hues.

With its dense green cover, undulating terrain, hillocks, and stream courses, the region harbours habitats for diverse flora and fauna. The Kapsi Forest Range headquarters under the West Bhanupratappur Division is responsible for the safeguard of forests and conservation of biodiversity in the area.

Civic administration
From the administrative perspective, the village has a unique and rather complex setup. For planning and development under the Panchayati Raj system of local self-governance, Kapsi is divided into two distinct gram panchayats (village councils) namely, Chhote Kapsi and Bade Kapsi. The portion that lies to the west of the Devda ravine is known as Chhote (smaller) Kapsi while that to the east is known as Bade (larger) Kapsi. Ironically, Chhote Kapsi is the larger of the two, both in terms of area and population, and is the commercial centre. 

It is also noteworthy that, while the Chhote Kapsi gram panchayat falls under the direct jurisdiction of Pakhanjur tehsil, the Bade Kapsi gram panchayat forms a part of the newly established (in June, 2021) Badgaon up-tehsil. Both Pakhanjur and Badgaon in-turn fall within the purview of the Kapsi forest range. At the block level, both the gram panchayats are placed under the administrative jurisdiction of the Koyalibeda Janapad Panchayat.

Rurban Cluster
The two constituent gram panchayats of Kapsi i.e., Chhote Kapsi and Bade Kapsi, along with the neighbouring smaller gram panchayats of Aalor, Bapu Nagar and Harangarh form the Bade Kapsi Rurban Cluster. The aim of the project is to enhance the standard of living of the residents by providing better basic and social amenities. The integrated cluster action plan (ICAP) was approved in 2018 under the phase II of Shyama Prasad Mukherjee Rurban Mission by the Govt. of India. The vision of the cluster is to retain the dominant agrarian culture besides borrowing urban features such as developing skilled labour force and specializing into value addition based livelihood intensive activities such as maize processing.

Sansad Adarsh Gram
Chhote Kapsi is the first village in the Kanker parliamentary constituency to be identified for development under the ambitious Sansad Adarsh Gram Yojana of the Government of India. The inaugural ceremony was flagged off at a public event on 27 March 2015, by then Lok Sabha Member of Parliament (MP) Shri Vikram Usendi, in presence of government officials and public representatives from the district. The primary objective of Sansad Adarsh Gram Yojana among other things, is to develop model villages to provide better standards of living and quality of life for inclusive growth of the rural population through:
 Improved basic amenities
 Higher productivity
 Enhanced human development
 Better livelihood opportunities
 Reduced disparities
 Access to rights and entitlements
 Wider social mobilization
 Enriched social capital.

Demography
According to 2011 Census of India, the Kapsi rural agglomeration had a population of 4,179.

 Chhote Kapsi had a population of 3050. The village had a sex ratio of 992 females per 1,000 males and 11.54% of the population were under six years of age. Effective literacy rate was 83.91% i.e., higher than Chhattisgarh state average of 70.28%. Male literacy was 88.54% and female literacy was 79.27%.
 Bade Kapsi had a population of 1129. The village had a sex ratio of 1034 females per 1,000 males and 14.70% of the population were under six years of age. Effective literacy rate was 58.05% i.e., lower than Chhattisgarh state average of 70.28%. Male literacy was 64.63% and female literacy was 51.64%.

Economy
The economy of Kapsi is chiefly agrarian. Large scale cultivation of paddy and maize are undertaken throughout Rabi and Kharif crop seasons. Fish farming and dairy farming are other major primary sector activities practised by the populace. Under the aegis of Department of Fisheries, Govt. Of Chhattisgarh, the Bade Kapsi Rurban Cluster has become an important centre for pisciculture in the state, even exporting to the neighbouring states of Maharashtra and Odisha. Sericulture and horticulture are also gradually gaining ground, albeit practised by a few.

Other forms of livelihood include peasantry, trade, small scale businesses, and local government jobs. The Netaji Market along with the adjacent smaller Atal Market in Chhote Kapsi is the center of all commercial activities for the village. A new market in Bade Kapsi, also known as the Gandhi Market, is quickly taking shape to cater to the growing demand of commercial spaces.

Banking services are provided by the following public-sector banks:

Education
For primary and secondary education, Kapsi has a number of Hindi as well as English medium schools, run by the government and private institutions. The quality of education in these schools is generally good with a fair emphasis on extracurricular activities, though the infrastructure is just about satisfactory given the rural setting. The colleges in the district impart basic post-secondary higher education. For good quality and specialized higher education, people are entirely dependent on larger cities such as Bhilai, Durg and Raipur.

Healthcare
As a result of insufficient healthcare facilities, majority of the residents rely on home-made remedies and quackery as first aid. Apart from this, a government run Primary Health Centre (PHC) and a handful of privately run health facilities provide primary healthcare. Higher healthcare needs are referred to cities such as Dhamtari, Bhilai and Raipur.

Utilities

Electricity
The electricity distribution and bill collection in Kapsi is the responsibility of Chhattisgarh State Power Distribution Company Limited (CSPDCL). The company operates a feeder substation and distribution center at Bade Kapsi.

Telephone and internet
State owned Bharat Sanchar Nigam Limited (BSNL) provides wired landline, 2G/3G cellular telephony and fibre broadband internet services in Kapsi. Reliance Jio Infocomm Limited (Jio) has started providing 4G LTE cellular services from November 2021. A non-functional cellular tower erected by the now defunct Reliance Communications Limited (RCOM) of the Anil Dhirubhai Ambani Group also exists.

Both the BSNL and RCOM facilities were vandalized and set on fire by Maoist rebels in an attack in December 2008. The BSNL services were reinstated within a few weeks after the incident whereas the RCOM service remained suspended and was subsequently withdrawn.

Transport

Road 
Kapsi is situated on Chhattisgarh State Highway 25 and is served only by road transport. It is well connected to all nearby major towns and cities by buses operated at regular intervals. In addition, inexpensive shared transportation (Mahindra Bolero, Force Cruiser, Tata Ace, etc.) are available throughout the day for local commute.

The approximate distance of Kapsi from the regional major towns and cities by road is as follows:

Rail 
Kapsi is not connected directly to the network of Indian Railways. Daily DEMU services connect this station to Raipur via Durg. The nearest long-haul railway station is Durg Jn.

There has been demands from various quarters to conduct the route-alignment survey and construction of the proposed Bhanupratappur-Gadchiroli railway line via Durgukondal, Kapsi and Pakhanjur. If the demands are met, it would provide a much needed impetus to the development of this area. This proposed line would serve as an alternative route between Nagpur and Vishakhapatnam, one of the busiest freight corridors in the country, by linking the Nagpur-Wadsa-Gadchiroli line to the Dalli Rajhara-Jagdalpur-Vishakhapatnam line at Bhanupratappur.

Air 

Tourism
Kherkatta Dam, officially known as Paralkot Reservoir near Kapsi is the largest dam of the Kanker district.

References

Cities and towns in Kanker district